Ebenezer Mill is a mill located in Knoxville, Tennessee.  It was constructed as a turbine mill to grind corn and wheat, and later modified for use as a saw mill.  The mill was added to the National Register of Historic Places in 1987 as an example of a late-19th century gristmill.

The mill sits on the banks of Ten Mile Creek (originally Sinking Creek) on the site of what was once the "Mansion Mill," a smaller gristmill built c. 1835 for the McClung estate.  The Mansion Mill was replaced by the current Ebenezer Mill c. 1870.  The Ebenezer Mill was severely damaged by a flood in 1942 and rebuilt in a more modern style, though much of the original machinery is still intact.

Notes

Buildings and structures in Knoxville, Tennessee
Grinding mills on the National Register of Historic Places in Tennessee
Grinding mills in Tennessee
National Register of Historic Places in Knoxville, Tennessee